SEG Geneva Arena (commonly known as the Geneva Arena, Genf Arena) is an indoor arena in Geneva, Switzerland. Part of the Palexpo complex, it opened in 1995, and it currently holds 9,500 spectators and hosts concerts and indoor sporting events, such as tennis and basketball.

Entertainment events

External links
Geneva Arena website

Event venues established in 1995
Buildings and structures in Geneva
Tourist attractions in Geneva
Indoor arenas in Switzerland
Basketball venues in Switzerland
20th-century architecture in Switzerland